Nicolae Vermont (October 10, 1866 – June 14, 1932) was a Romanian realist painter, graphic artist and muralist. He was noted for his wide range of subjects and his interest in social issues, and was an associate of the post-Impressionists Ştefan Luchian and Constantin Artachino, as well as a friend of the controversial art collector and political figure Alexandru Bogdan-Piteşti.

Biography
Born in Bacău, Vermont belonged to the Jewish community. Late in his life, Vermont abandoned Judaism and converted to the Romanian Orthodox Church.

He began his career in 1884, as a contributor to the journal Universul, while studying with Theodor Aman at the Academy of Fine Arts in Bucharest (graduated 1886). Vermont completed his training at the Munich Akademie der Bildenden Künste (1893). He was able to attend the latter institution after being endorsed by the major Romanian artist Nicolae Grigorescu.

While still in Munich, Vermont joined Tinerimea Artistică, a loose grouping of artists who rejected Academism—it rallied together Luchian, Arthur Verona, Kimon Loghi, Ipolit Strâmbu, Marius Bunescu, Alexandru Satmari, Oskar Späthe, Jean Alexandru Steriadi and Ştefan Popescu, and received backing from poet Ștefan Octavian Iosif. Like the rest of Tinerimea Artistică, Vermont was heavily influenced by Grigorescu during his youth.

In 1896, Vermont, Luchian, Artachino and Bogdan-Piteşti, founded Salonul Independenţilor, the local version of the French Société des Artistes Indépendants. The movement which they attempted to create accommodated various tenets, and, while proclaiming a need for renewal in Romanian art, stressed the importance of earlier traditions. As Luchian incorporated Symbolism, Vermont developed his own style, a religious form of Realism. In parallel, with Luchian, Juan Alexandru Paraschivescu-Alpar, and Artachino, Vermont was one of the first to introduce themes related to the lives of unemployed individuals and social drifters. Such work was influenced by the Akademie der Bildenden Künste'''s genre painting.

Bogdan-Piteşti declared Vermont "one of the most accomplished" among Romanian painters, and bought many of his works. Two years after Salonul Independenţilor opened for the public, its initiators (together with Ioan Bacalbaşa) founded Societatea Ileana, an association dedicated to promoting new styles in art. In 1906, during the 40th celebration of King Carol I's ascension to the Romanian throne, Vermont's paintings were exhibited in Bucharest alongside the works of Grigorescu, Verona and Loghi (they won the admiration of Krikor Zambaccian, the future art collector, who declared himself "obsessed" with their image).

Many of his works are hosted by public collections such as the National Museum of Art, the Vasile Pârvan Museum in Bârlad, the Bucovina Art Museum in Suceava, and the Art Museums in Constanţa and Râmnicu Vâlcea. A large portion of his art, belonging to collector Lazăr Munteanu, was destroyed during the 1944 Luftwaffe bombing of Bucharest. During his artistic career, Vermont also painted churches in Cernavodă (1893) and Măneşti, Prahova (1895), as well as decorating the ceilings of the Kalinderu (1904) and Cantacuzino Palaces in Bucharest.

Gallery
Click on an image to view it enlarged.

Notes

References
Vasile Drăguţ, Vasile Florea, Dan Grigorescu, Marin Mihalache, Pictura românească în imagini'', Editura Meridiane, Bucharest, 1970. 
 Krikor Zambaccian, Însemnările unui amator de artă ("The Recordings of an Art Aficionado"), published and hosted by Editura LiterNet; retrieved July 16, 2007

External links

Romanian printmakers
Romanian muralists
Realist painters
People from Bacău
Jewish painters
Romanian Jews
Converts to Eastern Orthodoxy from Judaism
Members of the Romanian Orthodox Church
Academy of Fine Arts, Munich alumni
1866 births
1932 deaths
19th-century Romanian painters
20th-century Romanian painters
20th-century printmakers